Sir Owen Edward Pennefather Lloyd  (1 January 1854 – 5 July 1941) was an Irish recipient of the Victoria Cross, the highest and most prestigious award for gallantry in the face of the enemy that can be awarded to British and Commonwealth forces.

Details
Lloyd was born in County Roscommon and educated at Fermoy College and Queens University, Cork (now University College Cork). He joined the British Army Medical Service, later the Royal Army Medical Corps (RAMC), in 1878. He was in the Zulu War in 1879 and the Transvaal War of 1881–82 before being sent, with the rank of Surgeon-Major, to join the Kachin Hills Expedition in Burma (now Myanmar). There on 6 January 1893 the following deed took place for which he was awarded the VC:

Lloyd took command of the fort after death of Captain Morton. In 1894–95 he was medical officer to the Franco-British boundary commission on the Mekong River that decided the Thai-Lao border after the Franco-Siamese War, and in 1898–99 he was medical officer to British-Chinese boundary commission on the Burma frontier. Later he was Principal Medical Officer in India and then in South Africa, served in World War I (mentioned in despatches), and was Colonel Commandant of the RAMC 1922–24 with the rank of major-general.

Lloyd was appointed CB in the 1910 Birthday Honours and was knighted KCB in the 1923 Birthday Honours. He died at St Leonards-on-Sea, Sussex, on 5 July 1941.

The medal
Lloyd's Victoria Cross is displayed at the Army Medical Services Museum (Aldershot, England).

References

SourcesListed in order of publication yearThe Register of the Victoria Cross (1981, 1988 and 1997)Ireland's VCs  (Dept of Economic Development, 1995)Monuments to Courage (David Harvey, 1999)Irish Winners of the Victoria Cross (Richard Doherty & David Truesdale, 2000)

External links
Location of grave and VC medal (Kensal Green Cemetery)''

Irish recipients of the Victoria Cross
British Army major generals
People from County Roscommon
1854 births
1941 deaths
19th-century Irish people
Alumni of Queens College Cork
Irish officers in the British Army
Knights Commander of the Order of the Bath
Burials at Kensal Green Cemetery
Royal Army Medical Corps officers
British Army recipients of the Victoria Cross
Military personnel from County Roscommon